The Vore Buffalo Jump is an archeological site in Crook County, Wyoming. Native American hunters could stampede bison in the direction of the pit, which was deep enough to kill or disable the animals that were driven into it. The location is one of a number of buffalo jump sites in the north central United States and southern Canada. The Vore site was used as a kill site and butchering site from about 1500 AD to about 1800 AD. About ten tons of bones were removed from the site. About five percent of the site has been excavated, and the pit is estimated to contain the remains of 20,000 buffalo.

Lithic evidence suggests that the Kiowa and Apache used the site as they migrated southwards to their modern home in the Texas-New Mexico region. Later peoples using the Vore site included the Shoshone, Hidatsa, Crow and Cheyenne.

The site was discovered during the construction of Interstate 90 in the early 1970s. Located on the Vore family ranch, the site was to be crossed by the Interstate.  Exploratory drilling in the sinkhole yielded quantities of bison bones. The University of Wyoming was notified of the potential archeological site and the road was moved to the south. The site was investigated in 1971 and 1972 by Dr. George Frison of the University of Wyoming. In 1982 the site was transferred to the University by the Vore family with the stipulation that it be developed as a public education center within twelve years.  Funding limitations prevented development, so the site was again transferred to the Vore Buffalo Jump Foundation, which has built a small interpretive center and provides interpretive services. The Vore site is located in a narrow strip of land between I-90 and old US 14. The site was placed on the National Register of Historic Places in 1973.

References

External links

Vore Buffalo Jump website
Vore Buffalo Jump at the Wyoming State Historic Preservation Office
Vore Buffalo Jump at the Wyoming Heritage website

Archaeological sites on the National Register of Historic Places in Wyoming
Buffalo jumps
Native American history of Wyoming
Protected areas of Crook County, Wyoming
Tourist attractions in Crook County, Wyoming
National Register of Historic Places in Crook County, Wyoming